The 2020 COSAFA U-17 Women's Championship was the second edition of the COSAFA U-17 Women's Championship. The tournament took place in Nelson Mandela Bay, South Africa on November 4–14.

Participants
All 14 COSAFA nation's U17 teams as well as Reunion were allowed to enter the tournament, out of which four finally participated. Tanzania was invited as a guest team for this tournament.

 (host)
 (guest)

Group stage
The group stage is played in a round-robin where all 5 teams play once against each other and where the top two teams advance to the final.

Final

Top Scorers

COSAFA-La Liga partnership
South Africa's Jessica Wade (also awarded best player of last years tournament) and Zambia's Tisilile Lungu(also scored 3 goals at last years tournament) was selected by the Technical Study Group to be traveling to Spain for a LaLiga development experience, where they will get the opportunity to observe the football life in Spain and train with a local team. The duo become the first players to get this opportunity on account of the new formalization of the partnership between COSAFA and La Liga to boost Southern African football.

Changes due to COVID-19
The tournament was originally planned to be played in Mauritius on April 17–26, with 8 participating nations, but in March COSAFA decided to postpone. Other than the four COSAFA nations finally participating, Mauritius, Botswana, Eswatini, and Malawi was set to play the tournament. When the new plan was set for the tournament to be played in South Africa in November, Tanzania had been invited and six teams should be divided into two groups where the winners and runners-up should advance to the semi-finals. After Botswana's withdrawal, as many of their players had lost time in school and were set to write exams, the five-team group was finally employed.

References

External links
 Official website

COSAFA Under-17 Championship
2020 in African football
International association football competitions hosted by South Africa
COSAFA Women's U17